Demong is a surname. Notable people with the surname include:

Peter Demong, Canadian municipal politician 
Bill Demong (born 1980), American Nordic combined skier